El Clásico, is the name given to the basketball matches between Real Madrid and FC Barcelona (named after the cities they are based in; both cities are separated by 621 km), the two most successful and most supported basketball teams in Spain. Just as their football rivalry, basketball Clásico is known for its intensity and adversarial nature.

Head-to-head statistics

Updated as of 26 January 2023.

Results

Liga ACB Playoffs

Copa del Rey

Supercopa

EuroLeague

Players who played for both clubs

Barcelona then Real Madrid
 1956:  Alfonso Martínez (via Aismalíbar Montcada)
 1956:  José Luis Martínez (via Aismalíbar Montcada)
 1957:  Rafael González-Adrio
 1959:  Jordi Parra
 1964:  Miguel "Ché" González
 1995:  Santi Abad (via Taugrés Baskonia)
 1995:  Zoran Savić (via PAOK Bravo)
 1999:  Aleksandar Đorđević
 1999:  José Luis Galilea (via León Caja España)
 2002:  Alain Digbeu
 2002:  Michael Hawkins (via Idea Śląsk)
 2002:  Derrick Alston (via Pamesa Valencia)
 2008:  Pepe Sánchez
 2013:  Ioannis Bourousis (via EA7 Emporio Armani Milano)
 2021:  Thomas Heurtel (via LDLC ASVEL)
 2021:  Ádám Hanga
 2022:  Mario Hezonja (via UNICS Kazan)

Real Madrid then Barcelona
 1958:  Alfonso Martínez 
 1958:  José Luis Martínez
 1990:  José "Piculín" Ortiz
 2002:  Dejan Bodiroga (via Panathinaikos)
 2012:  Ante Tomić
 2013:  Maciej Lampe (via Caja Laboral)
 2019:  Nikola Mirotić (via Milwaukee Bucks)
 2021:  Nicolás Laprovíttola

Managers who coached both clubs
  Božidar Maljković (1990–1992. Barcelona, 2004–2006. Real Madrid)

See also
 El Clásico – rivalry between the two clubs' football divisions

Notes

References

Basketball rivalries
FC Barcelona Bàsquet
Real Madrid Baloncesto